Efrem Geisen (born 1868 in Amsterdam) was a Dutch clergyman and bishop for the Roman Catholic Archdiocese of Jinan. He was ordained in 1893. He was appointed bishop in 1902. He died in 1919.

References 

1868 births
1919 deaths
Dutch Roman Catholic bishops